Quicksand were a Welsh rock band from Port Talbot who were active from 1969 until 1975.

History
Originally formed in 1969, they featured Michael "Will" Youatt (bass) (1950-2017), Jimmy Davies (guitar), Jeff Hooper (guitar), Robert Collins (keyboards) and Anthony Stone (drums). This line up recorded one single "Passing By"/"Cobblestones" (both written by Youatt) in 1970. Youatt left to join briefly Piblokto! then Man. Hooper also left and Phil Davies (bass) then joined the band. A second single "Time To Live"/"Empty Street, Empty Heart" was released in 1973 and was soon followed by the album Home Is Where I Belong later that year. The band ceased to exist in 1975 when Davies formed Alkatraz with Youatt.

Subsequent careers
After the band split up Collins became a sound man, initially for Man, but later for such people as Eric Clapton. Davies re-joined Youatt in a new band Alkatraz who recorded one album Doing a Moonlight for United Artists.

Discography

Album
Home is Where I Belong (Dawn, 1973; Esoteric 2011)

Various artists albums
Mixed Up Minds Part 5 (TTW, 2013) - Cobblestones
The Dawn Anthology (Essential 1999) - Home Is Where I Belong

Singles
"Passing By"/"Cobblestones" (Carnaby, 1970)
"Time to Live"/"Empty Street" (Dawn 1973)

References

British progressive rock groups
Musical groups disestablished in 1975
Musical groups established in 1969
Port Talbot
Welsh rock music groups